Venarsal is a former commune in the Corrèze department in central France. On 1 January 2016, it was merged into the new commune Malemort.

Population

See also
Communes of the Corrèze department

References

Former communes of Corrèze
Corrèze communes articles needing translation from French Wikipedia
Populated places disestablished in 2016